Endotricha tamsi is a species of snout moth in the genus Endotricha. It was described by Paul Ernest Sutton Whalley in 1963, and is known from São Tomé & Principe.

References

Moths described in 1963
Endotrichini
Insects of São Tomé and Príncipe
Moths of Africa